The Citra Award for Best Director is an award given at the annual Indonesian Film Festival (FFI) to Indonesian film directors in recognition for their achievement in the previous year. The Citra Awards, described by Screen International as "Indonesia's equivalent to the Oscars", are the country's most prestigious film awards and are intended to recognize achievements in films as well as to draw public interest to the film industry.

Edwin is the most recent winner with Vengeance Is Mine, All Others Pay Cash at the 2022 ceremony, his second win to date in the category.

History 
The award was first given in 1955 with the winner of that year, Lilik Sudjio for his film Tarmina, being selected from all eligible films a jury panel without shortlisted nominations. Owing to efficiency concerns and widespread disapproval of winners within the Indonesian film industry, beginning in 1979 the FFI instituted a nomination system in which a committee selects the winner from a shortlist that could range between four and six films.

There were no Citra Awards given between 1993 and 2003 due to sharp decline in domestic film production. It was reinstated as an annual event in 2004 after receiving funds from the Indonesian government.

As of 2020, Teguh Karya is the most decorated director in the Citra Awards history with six wins out of nine nominations, while Hanung Bramantyo has the most nominations with eleven, winning two. In addition to them, six other directors have won multiple Citra Awards for Best Director: Arifin C. Noer, Edwin, Sjumandjaja, Slamet Rahardjo, Mouly Surya, and Joko Anwar.

With her win for Fiksi. in 2008, Mouly Surya became the first and, as of 2022, the only woman to have won the Best Director award. She won another one for Marlina the Murderer in Four Acts in 2018. Ida Farida holds the distinction as the first woman director to receive a nomination with Semua Sayang Kamu in 1989. Following the revival of Indonesian cinema in the mid-2000s, more women have received nominations for Best Director, including Kamila Andini who have received four nominations, Upi Avianto with three, and Nia Dinata with two.

The award has been revoked once, in 2007, after Nayato Fio Nuala's 2006 win for Ekskul garnered heavy criticisms due to the film's unauthorized use of copyrighted materials from the 2000 film Gladiator and the 2005 film Munich.

Nominations and awards

Winners are highlighted in blue and listed in bold.

1950s

1960s

1970s

1980s

1990s

2000s

2010s

2020s

Multiple wins and nominations

Explanatory notes

See also 

 Cinema of Indonesia
 Indonesian Film Festival
Citra Award for Best Picture
 Citra Award for Best Actor
 Citra Award for Best Actress
 Citra Award for Best Supporting Actor
 Citra Award for Best Supporting Actress
 Maya Awards

References



Citra Awards
Awards for best director